Paul Dean may refer to:

Paul Dean (minister) (1789–1860), American universalist minister
Paul Dean (baseball) (1912–1981), American baseball pitcher
Paul Dean, Baron Dean of Harptree (1924–2009), British Conservative politician
Paul Dean (guitarist) (born 1946), Canadian guitarist and co-producer for Loverboy
Paul Dean (rugby union) (born 1960), Irish international rugby union player
Paul Dean (clarinetist) (born 1966), Australian clarinetist from Southern Cross Soloists
A stage name once used by the British musician and actor Paul Nicholas
A character in the 1982 film Parasite

See also

Paula Deen